

This is a list of the National Register of Historic Places listings in Douglas County, Nebraska.

This is intended to be a complete list of the properties and districts on the National Register of Historic Places in Douglas County, Nebraska, United States. The locations of National Register properties and districts for which the latitude and longitude coordinates are included below, may be seen in a map.

There are 191 properties and districts listed on the National Register in the county, including 3 National Historic Landmarks.  Six properties were once listed on the National Register, but have since been removed.

Current listings

|}

Former listings

Five properties were once listed but have been delisted.  In addition, the historic Clarinda & Page Apartments, at 3027 Farnam Street and 305-11 Turner Boulevard in Omaha, were deemed in a report to be NRHP-eligible, but they seem not to have actually been designated as eligible by the National Register program itself (as National Park Service "weekly lists" do not seem to record this).

|}

See also

 List of National Historic Landmarks in Nebraska
 National Register of Historic Places listings in Nebraska
 Omaha Landmarks

References

Douglas